The 1904 Prima Categoria season was won by Genoa.

Qualifications
Played on March 6

|}

Semifinal
Played on March 13

|}

Repetition
Played on March 20

|}

Final
Played on March 27

|}

References and sources
Almanacco Illustrato del Calcio - La Storia 1898-2004, Panini Edizioni, Modena, September 2005

1904
1903–04 in European association football leagues
1903–04 in Italian football